Bois de Boulogne is the title of two short 1896 films, both directed by Georges Méliès and both considered lost:

Bois de Boulogne (Porte de Madrid) 
Bois de Boulogne (Touring Club)